Jihaeng Station is a ground-level metro station on Line 1 of the Seoul Subway in Jihaeng-dong, Dongducheon, South Korea. It opened on January 30, 2005, to services on the Gyeongwon Line and services on the Seoul Metropolitan Subway began calling here on December 15, 2006. The station offers access to Dongducheon Foreign Language High School, Central Middle and High School, Jihaeng Elementary School, Science Tower and Songnae-dong Office, among other places.

Platforms
 Platform 1: to Ganeung / Seoul Station / Incheon
 Platform 2: to Ganeung / Seoul Station / Incheon
 Platform 3: to Soyosan / Dongducheon
 Platform 4: to Soyosan / Dongducheon

Exits
 Exit 1: Idan Elementary School, Dongducheon Office of Education, Dongducheon Fire Station
 Exit 2: Jihaeng Post Office, Saengyeon Middle School
 Exit 3: Dongducheon Registry Office, Dongducheon Foreign Language High School
 Exit 4: Jihaeng Elementary School, Korea Electric Power Corporation, Dongduchon Jungang High School, Songnae Jungang Middle School

References 

Seoul Metropolitan Subway stations
Railway stations opened in 2005
Metro stations in Dongducheon
Seoul Subway Line 1